Ultra Brite is an American brand of toothpaste and tooth-whitener marketed by Colgate-Palmolive in the United States. Marketed as a whitening toothpaste, its active ingredients are baking soda, hydrogen peroxide and sodium monofluorophosphate.

Colgate-Palmolive introduced Ultra Brite toothpaste in 1967.  Ultra Brite gained popularity at the time of its launch with a television and print commercial ad campaign, aimed at Baby Boomers, that stated, "Ultra Brite gives your mouth...[bling]...sex appeal!" It was introduced as an imitator of Maclean's adult toothpaste, but was soon reformulated with a peppermint flavor to give it a more pleasant taste. The paste was sold in the United Kingdom from the late 1970s, but was withdrawn in the 2000s owing to competitive pressures.

References

External links
"Colgate Introduces A Value-Priced Multi-Benefit Toothpaste", Investor Relations Statement, August 20, 1998

Brands of toothpaste
Colgate-Palmolive brands
Products introduced in 1967